Epeiromulona is a genus of moths in the subfamily Arctiinae.

Species
 Epeiromulona biloba Field, 1952
 Epeiromulona hamata Field, 1952
 Epeiromulona icterinus Field, 1952
 Epeiromulona lephina Field, 1952
 Epeiromulona phelina Druce, 1885
 Epeiromulona roseata Field, 1952
 Epeiromulona thysanata Field, 1952

References

Natural History Museum Lepidoptera generic names catalog

Lithosiini